The McCoy Polygonal  Barn is a historic building located near Hepburn in rural Page County, Iowa, United States. It was built in 1914 as a hog sale barn. The hexagon shaped building features white horizontal siding, a large monitor with 12 windows, and an aerator. It is only one of five barns known to have been built on a farm in Iowa with a large monitor. Because of this building's original use as a sale barn it was needed to provide the required amount of light. The barn has been listed on the National Register of Historic Places since 1986.

References

Infrastructure completed in 1914
National Register of Historic Places in Page County, Iowa
Barns on the National Register of Historic Places in Iowa
Polygonal barns in the United States